Kondavil is a suburb north of the Sri Lankan city of Jaffna. It is near many temples such as the Uppumada Pillaiyar Temple, Eelam famous eelaththu Thillaiyampathy sivakami Amman temple ( ஈழத்து தில்லையம்பதி சிவகாமி அம்மன் ஆலயம்) part of the Jaffna Peninsula, it was one of the final strongholds of the Tamil Tigers.

Transport
The area is served by the Kondavil railway station.

References 

Towns in Jaffna District
Nallur DS Division